The Round Up is a 1941 American Western film directed by Lesley Selander and written by Harold Shumate. The film stars Richard Dix, Patricia Morison, Preston Foster, Don Wilson, Ruth Donnelly, Jerome Cowan and Douglass Dumbrille. The film was released on April 4, 1941, by Paramount Pictures.

It is a remake of the 1920 silent film The Round-Up, and is noteworthy for casting Wilson (best known as Jack Benny's announcer) in a rare dramatic role as the tubby sheriff originally played by Roscoe Arbuckle.

Plot
At Janet Allen's wedding to Steve Payson, owner of the Sweetwater Cattle Ranch, her former fiancée Greg Lane, whom she thought dead, turns up. Greg disregards the fact she is now a married woman and tries to make love to her behind her husband's back.

Soon, on the Sweetwater ranch, against a background of Indian uprisings, rustlers, gun-running and bandits, the young bride is torn between loyalty to her husband and a burning love for her returned sweetheart.

Cast
Richard Dix as Steve Payson
Patricia Morison as Janet Allen (Payson)
Preston Foster as Greg Lane
Don Wilson as Sheriff 'Slim' Hoover
Ruth Donnelly as Polly Hope
Douglass Dumbrille as Capt. Bob Lane
Jerome Cowan as Wade McGee
Betty Brewer as Mary
Morris Ankrum as 'Parenthesis'
Dick Curtis as Ed Crandall
William Haade as Frane Battles
Clara Kimball Young as Mrs. Wilson
Weldon Heyburn as 'Cheyenne'
Lane Chandler as Taggert
Lee 'Lasses' White as Sam Snead

References

External links
 

1941 films
1940s English-language films
American Western (genre) films
1941 Western (genre) films
Paramount Pictures films
Films directed by Lesley Selander
American black-and-white films
1940s American films